Cave-In-Rock State Park is an Illinois state park, on , in the town of Cave-in-Rock, Hardin County, Illinois in the United States.  The state park contains the historic Cave-In-Rock, a landmark of the Ohio River.  It is maintained by the Illinois Department of Natural Resources (IDNR).

Geology
The park's primary feature is a -wide riverside cave formed by wind and water erosion and cataclysmic effects of the 1811–12 New Madrid earthquakes. The Cave-in-Rock was worn into the limestone bluffs of the Ohio River by floods, especially those caused by glacial meltwater following the Wisconsin ice age. Unlike Mammoth Cave in nearby Kentucky, it was not formed by typical karst processes; it is a tunnel eroded into the bluff.

History
Cave-in-Rock was known and used for thousands of years by the Native Americans.  The first European to discover the Cave was M. de Lery of France, who in 1729 mapped and named it "caverne dans Le Roc" (cf. supra).  This name, translated directly into English, is the name the cave bears to this day. Other names for the cave included Rock-In-Cave, Rocking Cave, Rock-and-Cave, House of Nature, The Cave, Big Cave, Potato Cave, and Murrell's Cave.

During the 1790s and the first three decades of the 19th century, Cave-in-Rock reached the height of its notoriety.  Flatboats carrying farm produce from Kentucky, Ohio, and southern Indiana began to float down the Ohio River towards the marketplace in New Orleans.  As a known Ohio River landmark, the cave was a landmark of this dangerous journey.  From approximately 1797 until 1799, the cave was a hideout for a notorious gang of bandits headed by Samuel Mason, who preyed upon the lawless river commerce. The outlaws Frank and Jesse James of the notorious James–Younger Gang also hid out in the cave, according to local lore, leaving their marks in the cave.

Later in the 19th century, Cave-in-Rock was tamed by settlers who formed the river town of Cave-In-Rock, Illinois near the cave.  The town survives to this day.  It became the site of a river ferry, adjacent to the state park, that crosses the Ohio River from Illinois Route 1 to Kentucky Route 91.

The cave has been the main feature of Illinois' Cave-in-Rock State Park since 1929.

First Illinois state park
With the inauguration of steamboat traffic on the Ohio River in the 1810s, travelers such as artist Karl Bodmer bought tickets to steam up and down the river, and Cave-in-Rock has been a recognized landmark of river tourism ever since.  In 1929, the state of Illinois acquired 64.5 acres of land, including the cave.  Other small parcels of land were acquired later to form the current park.  The state park, which stretches from the river's edge to the top of the adjacent  bluff, is maintained by IDNR for Ohio River access, camping, and hiking, including hikes to the historic cave.

In popular culture 
Walt Disney Productions used the site for the 1956 Davy Crockett adventure, Davy Crockett and the River Pirates. The cave overlooks Davy Crockett, his sidekick Georgie, and "King of the River" Mike Fink battling a group of river pirates headquartered at Cave-in-Rock. In 1962, the John Ford Western epic film How the West Was Won featured the cave. The 1999 In Search of History series Episode: River Pirates, a history documentary about the earliest and most active river pirates and frontier killers in the Ohio River Valley in the late 18th and early 19th Centuries, included the cave.

References

External links

Protected areas of Hardin County, Illinois
State parks of Illinois
Protected areas established in 1929
Caves of Illinois
Show caves in the United States
Landforms of Hardin County, Illinois
1929 establishments in Illinois